Abd Allah ibn Wahb may refer to:

Abd Allah ibn Wahb al-Rasibi (died 658), early Kharijite leader
Ibn Wahb (743–813), Maliki jurist